The Geely Yuanjing X3 is a subcompact CUV produced by Chinese manufacturer Geely. An electric variant featuring a special color and trim redesign was rebadged as the Geometry EX3 or Kungfu Cow under the Geometry brand from 2021.

Overview 
The Geely Yuanjing X3 was revealed in July 2017, and debuted in Q3 2017. The Yuanjing X3 was formerly known as the Yuanjing V3 during development, and was renamed prior to launch to fit into the later confirmed Geely Yuanjing crossover product series slotting between the Geely Yuanjing X1 and Geely Yuanjing X6. 

The Yuanjing X3 is based on the Geely Englon SC5-RV from 2011 to 2014, and utilizes the same engine, a 1.5 liter engine previously producing 94hp for the Englon SC5-RV. The same 1.5 liter engine was tuned up to 102 hp and mated to a 5-speed manual gearbox or a 4-speed automatic gearbox.

Geely Yuanjing X3 Pro and Maple X3 Pro 
A facelift was launched in April 2021 called the Yuanjing X3 Pro. The X3 Pro update is powered by a 1.5-litre engine producing 109hp and mated to a CVT gearbox. The Yuanjing X3 Pro was also rebadged and launched in May 2022 as the Maple X3 Pro as the first pure gasoline-powered vehicle under the relaunched Maple brand.

Maple 30X EV 
The Maple 30X EV is a subcompact electric crossover SUV based on the Geely Yuanjing X3 with the exterior body being essentially a rebadge. The Maple 30x  result of a partnership between Geely and Kandi Technologies. It was launched by the affiliate company of Kandi Technologies Group, Inc., Fengsheng Automotive in July 2020. Fengsheng also launched a mobility version of the Maple 30x customized for the urban mobility market.

The motor of the Maple 30X has a maximum output of 70kw (94hp) and a maximum torque of 180N.m, the electric driving range on one full charge is up to 306 km or 190 miles. The Maple 30X comes with express charging and standard charging options. Express charging enables the vehicle to be charged to 80% in 30 minutes. A home plug-in charging feature is also available for all future Maple brand electric vehicles.

Geometry EX3
The Geometry EX3 launched in 2021 is a subcompact electric crossover SUV based on the Geely Yuanjing X3. It comes with a 37.23 kWh battery providing a claimed range of 322 kilometers (200 miles). The EX3 was only sold in 2021 and was replaced by the completely redesigned Geometry E in 2022.

References 

2010s cars
Cars introduced in 2017
Cars of China
Crossover sport utility vehicles
Front-wheel-drive vehicles
Yuanjing X3
Mini sport utility vehicles